"You" is a song by Swedish electronic music duo Galantis. It was released on 1 April 2014 as the second single from their debut EP Galantis (2014). It was originally written for Britney Spears, entitled "I'll Remember You" for her eighth studio album Britney Jean but, for unknown reasons, was cut from the album and used by Galantis. The song contains uncredited vocals from Britney Spears in its chorus and Swedish singer Vincent Pontare in its verses, both modified with voice effects.

Music video
A music video to accompany the release of "You" was first released onto YouTube on 9 April 2014 at a total length of four minutes and twenty-six seconds.

Track listings

Charts

References

2014 singles
2014 songs
Songs written by Style of Eye
Songs written by Christian Karlsson (DJ)
Warner Music Group singles
Synth-pop ballads
Dutch Top 40 number-one singles
Songs written by Vincent Pontare
Galantis songs